Marcel André Couttet (27 April 1912 – 23 February 2002) was a French ice hockey player. He competed in the men's tournament at the 1936 Winter Olympics.

References

1912 births
2002 deaths
Ice hockey players at the 1936 Winter Olympics
Olympic ice hockey players of France
People from Chamonix
Sportspeople from Haute-Savoie